The tiger bee fly, Xenox tigrinus, is an insect of the family Bombyliidae (bee flies) found in the eastern United States and southern Ontario. It formerly went by the name Anthrax tigrinus. The distinctive wing pattern may resemble tiger stripes, giving the tiger bee fly its name. Like other members of the bee fly family, the tiger bee fly parasitizes the larvae of other insects.

Identification 
Their black body has two white spots on the abdomen and their transparent wings have a distinctive black pattern. The tiger bee fly may be mistaken for a large bee due to its coloration and size. Their bee mimicry (an example of Batesian mimicry) helps them avoid potential predators.

Life cycle 

Female tiger bee flies deposit fertilized eggs in carpenter bee nests. Rather than entering the nest itself, female tiger flies lay eggs near the nest entrance. When the larvae hatch, they consume the carpenter bee larvae. The fly larvae may also wait for the bees to enter the vulnerable pupal state before eating them. The tiger bee fly is the most common parasite of the eastern carpenter bee, Xylocopa virginica. It is also considered a pollinator.

Interactions with humans 
The tiger bee fly is commonly found near wooden fences and structures where carpenter bees make their nests. They do not bite or sting humans.

References

Bombyliidae
Diptera of North America
Insects of the United States
Insects described in 1984